Chandler Heights is an unincorporated community in Maricopa and Pinal Counties, Arizona, United States. Formerly, Chandler Heights had a ZIP code of 85227, but it has since been abolished, and the United States Postal Service now uses "Queen Creek" for all Chandler Heights addresses.

Much of Chandler Heights is located within the planning boundaries of the town of Queen Creek for future annexation, with a small portion (west of Recker Road) extending into the planning boundaries of the town of Gilbert.

History
The population of Chandler Heights was 75 in the 1960 census.

References

Unincorporated communities in Maricopa County, Arizona
Unincorporated communities in Pinal County, Arizona
Unincorporated communities in Arizona